Follingbo is a populated area, a socken (not to be confused with parish), on the Swedish island of Gotland. It comprises the same area as the administrative Follingbo District, established on 1January 2016.

It became operational on 24December 1959, and has since then been used for broadcasting television and radio to all of Gotland.

Geography 
Follingbo is the name of the socken as well as the district. It is also the name of the small village surrounding the medieval Follingbo Church, sometimes referred to as Follingbo kyrkby. It is situated in the west part of Gotland, just east of Visby.

, Follingbo Church belongs to Follingbo parish in Romaklosters pastorat.

By the Svaide vät lake in Follingbo is Svaidestugan, a recreation area with tracks for running in summer and cross-country skiing in winter. In 2015, plans were made to restore the partially overgrown lake to its former open state and use it for ice skating.

References

External links 

Objects from Follingbo at the Digital Museum by Nordic Museum

Populated places in Gotland County